Ondina vitrea is a species of sea snail, a marine gastropod mollusk in the family Pyramidellidae, the pyrams and their allies.

Description
The length of shell varies between 3.5 mm and 4.5 mm. The white shell is pellucid. The sculpture is decussated by microscopic striae. The teleoconch contains seven convex whorls. The suture is submargined. The columella is obliquely uniplicate.

Distribution
This species occurs in the following locations:
 European waters (ERMS scope)
 Mediterranean Sea : Sicily, Greece
 Portuguese Exclusive Economic Zone
 Spanish Exclusive Economic Zone

References

 Templado, J. and R. Villanueva 2010 Checklist of Phylum Mollusca. pp. 148–198 In Coll, M., et al., 2010. The biodiversity of the Mediterranean Sea: estimates, patterns, and threats. PLoS ONE 5(8):36pp

External links
 To CLEMAM
 To Encyclopedia of Life
 To World Register of Marine Species

Pyramidellidae
Gastropods described in 1866